For the athletics competitions at the 2016 Summer Paralympics, the following qualification systems were in place. Qualification began on 15 October 2014 ends on 14 August 2016.

Allocation of qualification slots
There is a maximum of 1100 athletics qualification slots available; 660 male and 440 female. In general, qualification slots are awarded to the athlete's National Paralympic Committee (NPC), not the individual athlete. The exception is with the Bipartite Commission Invitation slots, which are awarded to the individual athlete, not the NPC.

Each NPC can allocated a maximum of 48 male qualification slots and 32 female allocation slots (excluding Bipartite Commission Invitation slots). The slots cannot be transferred between gender; any unused slots are re allocated via the Bipartite Commission Invitation Allocation method.

Each NPC may enter up to three athletes in each individual event, one team of up to six athletes (but no less than four) in each relay event, and up to six athletes in each marathon event as long as no more than three athletes are competing in the marathon as their sole event. There is no limit on how many events an individual athlete may be entered in, as long as they have achieved the 'B' qualifying standard in that event between 15 October 2014 and 14 August 2016.

Qualification system
Qualification slots are allocated in the following order:

Qualifying standards

100 metres

200 metres

400 metres

800 metres

1500 metres

5000 metres

Marathon

High jump
Men only

Long jump

Shot put

Discus throw

Javelin throw

Club throw

References 

2016 Summer Paralympics